Bruce Creek may refer to:

Bruce Creek (Addition Creek tributary), a stream in Montana
Bruce Creek (Washington), a stream in Washington state